Waldi Rai is a community development block in Musafirkhana tehsil of Sultanpur district, Uttar Pradesh, India. It consists of 99 villages (98 inhabited and 1 uninhabited) with a total population of 182,455 people, in 31,431 households.

Demographics
As of 2011, Waldi Rai CD block has a population of 182,455 people, in 31,431 households. This population includes 92,058 males and 90,397 females. The corresponding sex ratio of 982 females to every 1000 males is slightly lower than the district rural average of 987. Members of the 0-6 age group numbered 27,598 as of 2011, or about 15.1% of the total. The sex ratio of this group is 930, which is slightly higher than the district rural average of 923. Members of Scheduled Castes numbered 40,828, or 22.38% of the total population; while members of Scheduled Tribes numbered 13, or 0.01% of the total. The literacy rate of Waldi Rai block as of 2011 is 67.04% (counting only people age 7 and up); literacy is higher among men and boys (78.02%) than among women and girls (55.96%). The Scheduled Castes literacy rate as of the same year is 53.56% (64.62% among men and boys and 42.25% among women and girls).

In terms of employment, 17.77% of Waldi Rai block residents were classified as main workers (i.e. people employed for at least 6 months per year) in 2011. Marginal workers (i.e. people employed for less than 6 months per year) made up 16.17%, and the remaining 66.05% were non-workers. Employment status varied according to gender, with 47.25% of men being either main or marginal workers, compared to only 20.40% of women.

Agriculture is the predominant source of employment in Waldi Rai block: 27.10% of the block's workers were cultivators who owned or leased their own land as of 2011, and a further 46.46% were agricultural labourers who worked someone else's land for wages. Another 5.85% were counted as household industry workers, and the remaining 20.59% were other workers.

Villages
Waldi Rai CD block has the following 99 villages:

References

Community development blocks in India